Pohrebyshche Synagogue - a former wooden synagogue building, located in Pohrebyshche, a town in Vinnytsia Oblast, Ukraine, was built in the 17th century.  It was destroyed in the 20th century.

History 
A wooden synagogue stood in Pohrebyshche in the first half of the 17th century, already in 1648 described as ancient. In the course of the Khmelnytsky Uprising  (1648–1657) and the wars of the 17th century the town was destroyed by fire several times. Possibly in 1690 the synagogue was rebuilt. 

Major restorations took place in 1790, and in 1892 the exterior was rebuilt while the interior was retained.  

The building was converted into a workers club in 1928 and destroyed during World War II.

Architecture 
The main hall was approximately square (12,00m × 12,40m) with a central part (8m) and two lateral parts, which were narrower (width 1,80m) and lower. The main hall was built up on three sides: vestibule with upper-level women's prayer area on the west side and low, single-storey women's prayer areas against north and south walls. At the western corners there were two-storey corner pavilions. The room on the southern side was heated and served as a meeting room for the community elders.

The walls were made of horizontal timbers, in the main hall they were reinforced by stiffeners.

The roof above the main hall was offset, two-tiered, with lower tier hipped and upper tier half-gabled. The corner-pavilions together with the galleries surrounding them were covered by hipped roofs.

The walls were originally polychromed; on the east wall remained traces of the former coloured wall paintings, presenting various birds, plants and domesticated animals.

The holy ark, width 1,70m, height 4,50m, was placed on a table of drawers. In three tiers it was ornamented by winding flora with symmetrically positioned birds and animals.

The bimah stood on an octagonal podium and was surrounded by a balustrade with banisters.

See also 
 List of synagogues in Ukraine

References 

Synagogues in Ukraine
Former synagogues in Ukraine
17th-century synagogues
Synagogues destroyed by Nazi Germany
Buildings and structures in Vinnytsia Oblast
Wooden synagogues